12838 Adamsmith, provisional designation , is a stony Koronis asteroid from the outer region of the asteroid belt, approximately 6 kilometers in diameter. The asteroid was discovered on 9 March 1997, by Belgian astronomer Eric Walter Elst at ESO's La Silla Observatory in northern Chile. It was named after Scottish philosopher and economist Adam Smith.

Orbit and classification 

Adamsmith is a member of the Koronis family, a group of co-planar, stony asteroids in the outer main-belt, named after 158 Koronis. It orbits the Sun  at a distance of 2.7–3.1 AU once every 4 years and 11 months (1,789 days). Its orbit has an eccentricity of 0.07 and an inclination of 1° with respect to the ecliptic.

Physical characteristics 

In January 2011, a rotational lightcurve of Adamsmith was obtained from photometric observations by astronomers at the Palomar Transient Factory in California. Lightcurve analysis gave a rotation period of  hours with a brightness variation of 0.48 magnitude.

The Collaborative Asteroid Lightcurve Link assumes a standard albedo for stony Koronian asteroids of 0.24 and calculates a diameter of 6.2 kilometers with an absolute magnitude of 13.22.

Naming 

This minor planet was named for the economist Adam Smith (1723–1790), Scottish moral philosopher and principal figure in the Scottish Enlightenment. Known for his works The Theory of Moral Sentiments (1759) and An Inquiry into the Nature and Causes of the Wealth of Nations (1776), he introduced the concept of the division of labour which represents a qualitative increase in productivity, and suggested that self-interest and competition can lead to economic prosperity. The approved naming citation was published by the Minor Planet Center 30 July 2007 .

References

External links 
 Asteroid Lightcurve Database (LCDB), query form (info )
 Dictionary of Minor Planet Names, Google books
 Asteroids and comets rotation curves, CdR – Observatoire de Genève, Raoul Behrend
 Discovery Circumstances: Numbered Minor Planets (10001)-(15000) – Minor Planet Center
 
 

012838
Discoveries by Eric Walter Elst
Named minor planets
19970309